Esin Engin (May 17, 1945 – May 4, 1997) was a Turkish musician, composer, arranger and film actor.

Biography
He was born in Sivas, Turkey in 1945 to a family of Crimean Tatar origin. He graduated from North Collins High School in New York, US in 1963. Then he returned to Turkey and completed a journalist degree in Istanbul in 1968.

Discography
 Modern Oyun Havaları (1973)
 Anadolu (1973)
 Dünden Bugüne (1974)
 Modern Oyun Havaları 2 (1975)
 Oyun Havaları, Vol. 1 (1989)
 Oyun Havaları, Vol. 2 (1995)
 Çiftetelli – Oyun Havaları, Vol. 3
 Oyun Havaları, Vol. 4 (1996)
 Film Müzikleri, Vol. 1 (1995)
 Film Müzikleri, Vol. 2 (2000, posthumous album)
 Film Müzikleri, Vol. 3 (2000, posthumous album)
 Modern Fasıl (1978)
 Nostaljik Fasıl (1992)
 Tangolar (1974, reissued in 1996)
 Son Tango (1998, posthumous album)
 Best of Belly Dance from Turkey
 Nostalgic Russian Tzigane (1990)
 Gypsy Fire (1990)
 Best of Russia
he also was the king of Turkish music

Filmography

Film score composer
 Kanlı Nigar (1981)
 Adile Teyze (1983)
 Çalıkuşu (1986)
 Yeniden Doğmak (1987)
 Hayallerim, Aşkım ve Sen (1987)
 Tek Başına Bir Kadın (1988)
 Sürgün (aka "The Banishment") (1992)
 Tatlı Betüş (1993)

Actor
 Seven Ne Yapmaz (1970)
 Dert Bende (1973)

See also
 Music of Turkey
 Turkish pop music

Notes

References
 Sinematürk – Biography of Esin Engin 
 EMI Music Turkey – Brief biography of Esin Engin 
 Amazon.com – Selected discography of Esin Engin. Accessed February 17, 2009.

External links
 

1945 births
1997 deaths
Turkish male film actors
Turkish composers
Turkish people of Crimean Tatar descent
Deaths from cancer in Turkey
Deaths from leukemia
20th-century Turkish male actors
20th-century composers
People from Sivas